Lucy Claire Frazer  (born 17 May 1972) is a British politician and barrister serving as Secretary of State for Culture, Media and Sport since February 2023. 

A member of the Conservative Party, Frazer previously served as Solicitor General for England and Wales, Minister of State for Prisons and Probation, Minister of State for Transport and Minister of State for Housing and Planning. She has been returned as the Member of Parliament (MP) for South East Cambridgeshire since 2015. Prior to being elected to Parliament, she practised as a barrister, taking silk in 2013.

Early life
Born on 17 May 1972 in Yorkshire, Frazer is descended from Jewish immigrants, among whom was her grandfather Dr Hyman Frazer CBE, headmaster of Gateway Grammar School in Leicester.

Education
Frazer was educated at Gateways School for Girls and Leeds Girls' High School, before studying Law at Newnham College, Cambridge, where she was elected President of the Cambridge Union.

Career
Before entering politics, Frazer worked as a barrister in commercial law in London, practising in South Square Chambers, Gray's Inn. She was appointed Queen's Counsel at the age of 40. She was selected as the Conservative Prospective Parliamentary candidate for South East Cambridgeshire in December 2013, despite claims that she had been beaten in an open primary by Heidi Allen, who was later elected as MP for South Cambridgeshire. Frazer succeeded in being elected at the 2015 general election with 28,845 votes (48.5%), a majority of 16,837. After entering the 
Commons, she was then elected to the Education Select Committee later that year.

Frazer supported the UK remaining within the European Union prior to the 2016 referendum. In July 2016, she became Parliamentary Private Secretary to the Paymaster General and Minister for the Cabinet Office, Ben Gummer.

Frazer put forward a Private Member's Bill to Parliament for making upskirting an offence in England and Wales; this attained Royal Assent on 12 February 2019. Before the Act was passed, the common law offence of outraging public decency might have been applicable.

She was appointed Parliamentary Under-Secretary of State for Justice in January 2018, before being promoted Solicitor General for England and Wales in May 2019.

On 25 July 2019, Prime Minister Boris Johnson appointed Frazer as Minister of State for Prisons. She was then temporarily reappointed as Solicitor General when Suella Braverman took maternity leave in March 2021, being sworn of the Privy Council. Frazer returned to her role as Minister of State for Prisons upon Braverman's return from leave on 10 September 2021.

On 16 September 2021, Frazer was promoted Financial Secretary to the Treasury.

In November 2021 it was claimed by the Liberal Democrat MP, Sarah Olney, that Frazer had a conflict of interest in respect of a contract held by her husband's company to supply temporary staff to government departments. It had previously been disclosed that six of these workers had been employed using a "controversial tax-avoidance scheme".

In June 2022, Frazer declared her support for Johnson in the 2022 vote of confidence in his Conservative Party leadership.

Frazer served as Minister of State for Transport from September to October 2022.

On 26 October 2022, following the election of Rishi Sunak as Prime Minister, Frazer was appointed Minister of State for Housing and Planning. In the February 2023 cabinet reshuffle, Frazer joined the Cabinet of the United Kingdom as Secretary of State for Culture, Media and Sport.

Personal life
In 2002, Frazer married David Leigh, now chief executive of a London recruitment company. They have two children.

See also
 List of presidents of the Cambridge Union
 Department for Culture, Media and Sport

Notes

References

External links 

1972 births
Living people
Politicians from Yorkshire
People educated at Leeds Girls' High School
Alumni of Newnham College, Cambridge
Presidents of the Cambridge Union
21st-century English lawyers
English barristers
Members of Gray's Inn
21st-century English women politicians
21st-century King's Counsel
English King's Counsel
Conservative Party (UK) MPs for English constituencies
Female justice ministers
Members of the Privy Council of the United Kingdom
Solicitors General for England and Wales
British Secretaries of State
English people of Jewish descent
Female members of the Cabinet of the United Kingdom
Female members of the Parliament of the United Kingdom for English constituencies
UK MPs 2015–2017
UK MPs 2017–2019
UK MPs 2019–present